Coláiste Lorcáin is a post-primary school located in the town of Castledermot, County Kildare, in Republic of Ireland. The school was established in July 1982 as a result of an amalgamation between the Vocational School, Castledermot and St. Mary's Secondary School. The school is dedicated to St. Laurence O'Toole, the patron saint of the Arch Diocese of Dublin, who was born in the parish of Castledermot around the year 1123. The school is under the direction of a Board of Management which includes representatives of the Sisters - The Poor Servants of the Mother of God, Kildare Vocational Education Committee, the parents and teachers of the school. Castledermot is situated on the main Dublin - Waterford road approximately ten km north of Carlow town.

Achievements 
The Coláiste Lorcain Junior Rugby team won the Leinster Junior Development Cup in 2009.

Coláiste Lorcáin has a history of competition in the BT Young Scientist winning two first prizes and a third prize.

References

External links
 Coláiste Lorcáin Website

Secondary schools in County Kildare
Irish-language schools and college
1982 establishments in Ireland
Educational institutions established in 1982